The Two Boys (French: Les deux gosses) is a 1936 French drama film directed by Fernand Rivers. It is based on the 1880 novel of the same name by Pierre Decourcelle, which had previously been made into a silent film The Two Boys.

The film's sets were designed by Robert Gys.

Cast

References

Bibliography 
 Goble, Alan. The Complete Index to Literary Sources in Film. Walter de Gruyter, 1999.

External links 
 

1936 films
1936 drama films
French drama films
1930s French-language films
Films directed by Fernand Rivers
Remakes of French films
Sound film remakes of silent films
French black-and-white films
1930s French films